Yannick dos Santos Djaló (born 5 May 1986) is a Portuguese former professional footballer who played mainly as a forward but also as a winger.

He played most of his professional career with Sporting after reaching the club's youth system at the age of 15, going on to appear in more than 150 official games and win four major titles. He moved to Benfica in 2012, and won the Portuguese League Cup that year, but totalled only five appearances in 4 years, spending most of his time out on loan.

Djaló earned 22 caps for Portugal at youth level, and made his only senior appearance in 2010.

Club career

Sporting
Born in Bissau, Guinea-Bissau, Djaló was brought up through Sporting CP's prolific youth system, and made his Primeira Liga debut on 16 September 2006, playing the second half of a 0–1 home loss against F.C. Paços de Ferreira. He proved himself a quality player, often coming off the bench, and also appeared in the club's campaign in the UEFA Champions League, renewing his contract during the season until 2013.

On 6 April 2008, after a four-month absence due to injury, Djaló scored both goals in a 2–0 home win over S.C. Braga, having also found the net the previous week as a substitute in a 4–1 away defeat of Associação Naval 1º de Maio. He finished the season in good form, netting the only goal in a win at Paços de Ferreira which proved crucial in helping the side to retain their second place in the league; in the Taça de Portugal, he scored twice in a thrilling 5–3 semi-final win against city-rivals S.L. Benfica.

On 16 August 2008, Djaló scored both goals in Sporting's win against defending league champions FC Porto to claim the Portuguese Supercup for the second year in a row. During 2009–10 he was an everpresent attacking figure, up front or in the wings and, on 2 April 2010, he netted his first career hat-trick, at home against Rio Ave FC (5–0).

On 26 August 2010, Djaló scored in the 90th minute to help the Lions defeat Brøndby IF 3–0 after losing 0–2 at home, thus qualifying for the UEFA Europa League's group stage.

Cancelled transfer to Nice
On 31 August 2011, the very last day of the summer transfer window, Djaló left Sporting, signing for OGC Nice in Ligue 1 for €6 million. On 7 September, FIFA ruled that his transfer would be voided due to the move being completed following the closure of the transfer deadline, and the French club's officials announced that they would appeal the ruling.

After FIFA failed to take any action regarding the appeal, on 28 September, Nice executive Julien Fournier announced that the club would take the case to the Court of Arbitration for Sport (CAS). Two weeks later the appeal was rejected, which meant Djaló would not be eligible to represent a new team until January 2012; on the following day after the CAS ruling, Fournier confirmed to Portuguese radio station Rádio Renascença that the player would be returning to Sporting.

Benfica
On 31 January 2012, free agent Djaló signed a four-and-a-half-year contract with Benfica. Exactly seven months later, in the last hours of the summer transfer window, he moved to another team in France's top flight, Toulouse FC, joining on loan with an option to make the move permanent at the end of the season.

Djaló was loaned to Major League Soccer side San Jose Earthquakes on 10 March 2014, until the end of the campaign. He subsequently returned to Benfica, being assigned to the B-team in the Segunda Liga.

On 26 January 2015, Djaló was loaned to FC Mordovia Saransk in the Russian Premier League until the end of the season. The move was extended for another year on 7 August.

Later years
In February 2016, Djaló terminated his contract with Benfica, signing for one year with Ratchaburi F.C. from the Thai Premier League immediately after. On 24 August 2017, the 31-year-old returned to his country of adoption after agreeing to a one-year deal at Vitória de Setúbal; having made only two substitute appearances, he returned to Ratchaburi the following June.

International career
Djaló chose to represent Portugal internationally, appearing for the country in various youth levels. Twelve days after his 2008 Supercup exploits, he was called up to the senior team by manager Carlos Queiroz, but did not make his debut.

In late August 2010, Djaló was selected for two UEFA Euro 2012 qualifiers after Porto's Silvestre Varela – his former Sporting teammate – suffered an injury. He finally made his debut on 3 September, playing the last six minutes of the 4–4 home draw against minnows Cyprus after replacing Hugo Almeida.

Personal life
Born in Guinea-Bissau, Djaló lived most of his life in the Portuguese capital, Lisbon. He is the cousin of the Bissau-Guinean footballer José Embaló. In May 2010 he married singer and TV-personality Luciana Abreu, subsequently taking his wife's surname and signing as "Yannick Abreu Djaló". The couple welcomed their first child, Lyonce Viktórya, early in the following year, the player having already fathered Christian Martim (born 2008) in a previous relationship.

Honours

Club
Sporting
Taça de Portugal: 2006–07, 2007–08
Supertaça Cândido de Oliveira: 2007, 2008
Taça da Liga runner-up: 2007–08, 2008–09

Benfica
Taça da Liga: 2011–12

Individual
Primeira Liga Young Player of the Month: March 2007

References

External links
 
 National team data 
 
 
 

1986 births
Living people
Bissau-Guinean emigrants to Portugal
Portuguese people of Bissau-Guinean descent
Sportspeople from Bissau
Bissau-Guinean footballers
Portuguese footballers
Association football wingers
Association football forwards
Primeira Liga players
Segunda Divisão players
Sporting CP B players
Sporting CP footballers
Casa Pia A.C. players
S.L. Benfica footballers
Vitória F.C. players
Ligue 1 players
Toulouse FC players
Major League Soccer players
San Jose Earthquakes players
Russian Premier League players
FC Mordovia Saransk players
Yannick Djalo
Yannick Djalo
Portugal youth international footballers
Portugal under-21 international footballers
Portugal B international footballers
Portugal international footballers
Bissau-Guinean expatriate footballers
Portuguese expatriate footballers
Expatriate footballers in France
Expatriate soccer players in the United States
Expatriate footballers in Russia
Expatriate footballers in Thailand
Portuguese expatriate sportspeople in France
Portuguese expatriate sportspeople in the United States
Portuguese expatriate sportspeople in Russia
Portuguese expatriate sportspeople in Thailand
Bissau-Guinean expatriate sportspeople in France